Castilian Unity (UdCa) is a conservative moderate Castilian nationalist political party active in Castilla-La Mancha. UdCa was founded in Ciudad Real by Emilio López Nieto, former secretary general of the PP in Ciudad Real, in December 2001 and formed, in part, by former members of the Regionalist Party of Castilla-La Mancha (PRCM). Its implementation outside the province of Ciudad Real is negligible.

Ideology
UdCa defends the creation of a Castilian autonomous community, unifying the current 5 Castilian autonomies: Castilla y León, Castilla-La Mancha, Cantabria, Community of Madrid y La Rioja. UdCa is seen as a regionalist party, although its president, Emilio Nieto, defends that Castile is a nation in Spain, so the party is also usually categorized as moderate nationalist organization. The party is also conservative and positioned in the centre-right.

History
In the local elections of 2003 UdCa gained the mayorship in Puebla de Don Rodrigo and a total of 6 town councillors.

References

External links
unidadcastellana.es

Political parties in Castilla–La Mancha
Conservative parties in Spain
Nationalist parties in Spain
Castile (historical region)